Freek Thoone (born 29 June 1985) is a Dutch football player who plays for AWC Wijchen.

Club career
He made his professional debut in the Eerste Divisie for Achilles '29 on 3 August 2013 in a game against FC Emmen.

References

External links
 

1985 births
People from Venray
Living people
Dutch footballers
Achilles '29 players
Eerste Divisie players
Association football forwards
Footballers from Limburg (Netherlands)